Events from the year 1402 in France

Incumbents
 Monarch – Charles VI

Births
 23 November – Jean de Dunois, soldier (died 1468)

Deaths
 25 April – Jean de La Grange, bishop (born 1325)
 8 November – Joan of Brittany, sister of Duke of Brittany (born 1341)
19 January – Bonne of Bourbon, Regent of Savoy (born 1341)

References

Links

1400s in France